Dennis Orcollo (born January 28, 1979), is a Filipino professional pool player, nicknamed "RoboCop" and has been called "The Money-Game King" throughout the Philippines and the United States.

Early life
Orcollo is the second of four brothers. His father was killed in a boating accident caused by a windstorm when he was young. He started practicing pool at 8 years of age through his grandfather's table. Because of financial problems, he gave up school at third grade, and focused on his sport.

Career
Orcollo began competing outside the Philippines in 2002. That year, he competed in the WPA World Nine-ball Championship where he finished 17th place.

In 2006, Orcollo began his campaign in the U.S. There he won a number of tournaments, including the Reno Open, the Hard Times Nine-ball Tournament and two  events.  Because his compatriots had entered a less prestigious event in Asia, Orcollo was the only player from the Philippines to compete in the inaugural World Straight Pool Championship. Also in 2006, Orcollo won the last edition of the World Pool League tournament against Niels Feijen.

In 2007, Orcollo reached the finals of the WPA World Eight-ball Championship only to be bested by countryman Ronato Alcano. He would again reach the finals of the same event in 2011, this time to win against Niels Feijen.

In 2016, Orcollo defeated Shane Van Boening, 200–121 to win the CSI U.S. Open Straight Pool Championship,

In 2020, Orcollo recorded a 120–119 victory against Shane Van Boening to be crowned The Money Game King in a three-day one-on-one 9-ball tournament held at Bill's Bar and Billiards in Oklahoma City.

Orcollo was deported from the United States in January 2022 reportedly due to overstaying in the country. He is barred from going back to the United States for five years, consequentially making him unable to compete in US tournaments.

Titles and achievements

References

External links

Orcollo bio from Billiards Digest

Filipino pool players
1979 births
Living people
Place of birth missing (living people)
World champions in pool
Asian Games medalists in cue sports
Asian Games gold medalists for the Philippines
Medalists at the 2010 Asian Games
Cue sports players at the 2010 Asian Games
World Games bronze medalists
Competitors at the 2013 World Games
Southeast Asian Games gold medalists for the Philippines
Southeast Asian Games bronze medalists for the Philippines
Southeast Asian Games medalists in cue sports
WPA World Eight-ball Champions
Competitors at the 2017 Southeast Asian Games
Competitors at the 2005 Southeast Asian Games
Competitors at the 2009 Southeast Asian Games
Competitors at the 2011 Southeast Asian Games
Competitors at the 2013 Southeast Asian Games
Competitors at the 2015 Southeast Asian Games
Competitors at the 2019 Southeast Asian Games
People deported from the United States